Littlerock High School is a public, co-educational high school built in 1989. It is located in Littlerock, California, United States. The school serves Littlerock and the surrounding communities of Lake Los Angeles, Pearblossom, and Llano. It is part of the Antelope Valley Union High School District (AVHSD).

Littlerock High School is designated as a Title I school.

Notable alumni
 Justin Gocke, former child actor
 Justin Tryon, NFL player
 Delwyn Young, Major League Baseball player (Los Angeles Dodgers and Pittsburgh Pirates)
 Aaron Meeks, former child star

References

External links

Education in Palmdale, California
High schools in Los Angeles County, California
Public high schools in California
1989 establishments in California